= Agriculture in Santa Catarina =

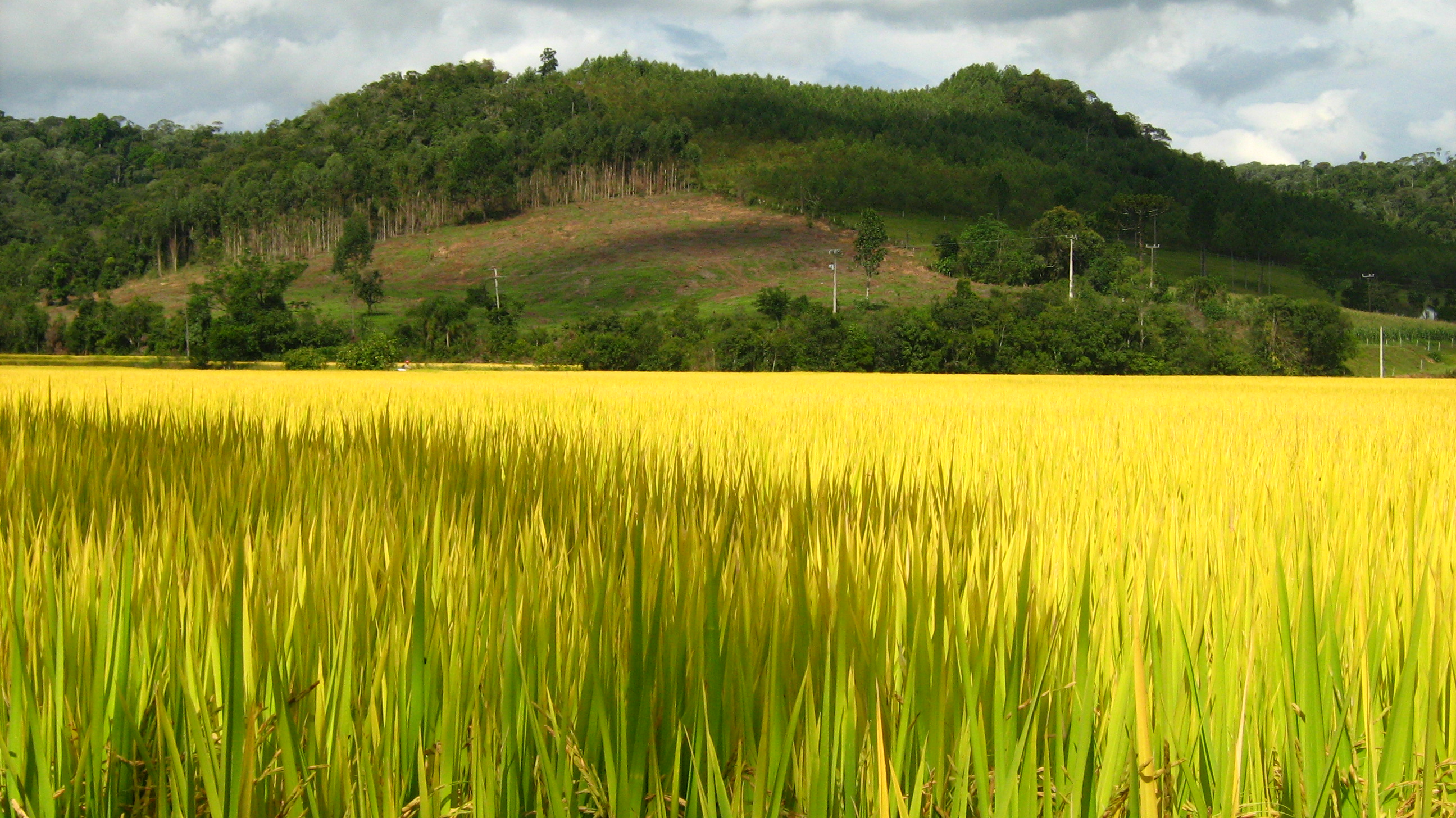
Rice Plantation near Rio do Sul-SC, Brazil

The agriculture in Santa Catarina is one of the main economic activities of this Brazilian state. The agricultural sector is equivalent to 13.6% of the labor force. Agriculture and farm diversification has taken place mostly by smaller farms. Between 1982 and 1983, floods claimed the lives of Santa Catarina. The result of the flooding occurred in losses of more than Cr$ 900 billion. The floods in 1984 and the strength of a drought in 1985-1986 were the agents that caused the punishment of economics and population.

Corn is the main wealth produced by the state. The corn crop is present throughout the territory, especially in the highlands. In 2012, maize production in Santa Catarina was 2,870,450 t, and the eighth largest producer of corn Brazilian state. Cassava is another major wealth produced by the state (529 648 t) and its presence spreads its whole territory. As a cultural reference, the coffee branch appears in the coat of arms of Santa Catarina because it was formerly cultivated in coastal state.

In 2012, Santa Catarina was the sixth Brazilian state that produced more beans (115,719 t), the first that produced the most onions (376.603 t), the first that produced the most garlic (19,315) and the second most produced tobacco (237 213 t). Santa Catarina also produces rice, sugarcane, soybean, wheat, tomato and irish potato.

Fruits that only grow in temperate climates, such as apples, plums, peaches, nectarines and grapes are grown in Santa Catarina. In 2012, Santa Catarina was the first state that produced the most apples in Brazil ( 659,756 t ) and the fifth most produced grape ( 71,019 t ).
